The Elliott Wave Principle, or Elliott wave theory, is a form of technical analysis that finance traders use to analyze financial market cycles and forecast market trends by identifying extremes in investor psychology and price levels, such as highs and lows, by looking for patterns in prices.

Ralph Nelson Elliott (1871–1948), an American accountant, developed a model for the underlying social principles of financial markets by studying their price movements, and developed a set of analytical tools in the 1930s. He proposed that market prices unfold in specific patterns, which practitioners today call Elliott waves, or simply waves. Elliott published his theory of market behavior in the book The Wave Principle in 1938, summarized it in a series of articles in Financial World magazine in 1939, and covered it most comprehensively in his final major work, Nature's Laws: The Secret of the Universe in 1946. Elliott stated that "because man is subject to rhythmical procedure, calculations having to do with his activities can be projected far into the future with a justification and certainty heretofore unattainable."

Foundation
The Elliott Wave Principle posits that collective trader psychology, a form of crowd psychology, moves between optimism and pessimism in repeating sequences of intensity and duration. These mood swings create patterns in the price movements of markets at every degree of trend or time scale.

In Elliott's theory, market prices alternate between an impulsive, or motive, phase, and a corrective phase on all time scales of trend, as the illustration shows. Impulses are always subdivided into a set of five lower-degree waves, alternating again between motive and corrective character, so that waves 1, 3, and 5 are impulses, and waves 2 and 4 are smaller retraces of waves 1 and 3, respectively. Corrective waves subdivide into three smaller-degree waves starting with a five-wave counter-trend impulse, a retrace, and another impulse. In a bear market the dominant trend is downward, and the pattern is reversed—five waves down and three up. Motive waves always move with the trend, while corrective waves move against it.

Wave degree

The Elliott Wave Principle states that markets grow from small price movements by linking Elliot wave patterns to form larger five-wave and three-wave structures that exhibit self-similarity, applicable on all timescales. Each level of such timescales is called the degree of the wave, or price pattern. Each degree of waves consists of one full cycle of motive and corrective waves. Waves 1, 3, and 5 of each cycle are motive in character, while waves 2 and 4 are corrective. The majority of motive waves assure forward progress in the direction of the prevailing trend, in bull or bear markets, but yielding an overall principle of growth of a market.

The overall movement of a wave one degree higher is upward in a bullish trend. After the initial five waves forward and three waves of correction, the sequence is repeated on a larger degree and the self-similar fractal geometry continues to unfold. The completed motive pattern comprises 89 waves, followed by a completed corrective pattern of 55 waves.

Each degree of a pattern in a financial market has a name. Practitioners use symbols for each wave to indicate both function and degree. Numbers are used for motive waves, and letters for corrective waves (shown in the highest of the three idealized series of wave structures or degrees). Degrees are not strictly defined by absolute size or duration, by form. Waves of the same degree may be of very different size or duration.

While exact time spans may vary, the customary order of degrees is reflected in the following sequence:
Grand supercycle: multi-century
Supercycle: multi-decade (about 40–70 years)
Cycle: one year to several years, or even several decades under an Elliott Extension
Primary: a few months to two years
Intermediate: weeks to months
Minor: weeks
Minute: days
Minuette: hours
Subminuette: minutes
Some analysts specify additional smaller and larger degrees.

Wave personality and characteristics
Elliott wave analysts (or Elliotticians) hold that each individual wave has its own signature or characteristic, which typically reflects the psychology of the moment. Understanding those personalities is key to the application of the Wave Principle; they are defined below. (Definitions assume a bull market in equities; the characteristics apply in reverse in bear markets.)

Pattern recognition and fractals
Elliott's market model relies heavily on looking at price charts. Practitioners study developing trends to distinguish the waves and wave structures, and discern what prices may do next; thus the application of the Wave Principle is a form of pattern recognition.

The structures Elliott described meet the common definition of a fractal (self-similar patterns appearing at every degree of trend). Elliott wave practitioners argue that just as naturally occurring fractals often expand and grow more complex over time, the model shows that collective human psychology develops in natural patterns, via buying and selling decisions reflected in market prices: "It's as though we are somehow programmed by mathematics. Seashell, galaxy, snowflake or human: we're all bound by the same order." Critics, however, argue it is a form of pareidolia.

Wave rules and guidelines
A correct Elliott wave count must observe three rules:
Wave 2 never retraces more than 100% of wave 1.
Wave 3 cannot be the shortest of the three impulse waves, namely waves 1, 3 and 5.
Wave 4 never enters the price territory of wave 1
A common guideline called "alternation" observes that in a five-wave pattern, waves 2 and 4 often take alternate forms; a simple sharp move in wave 2, for example, suggests a complex mild move in wave 4. Alternation can occur in impulsive and corrective waves. Elliott observed that alternate waves of the same degree must be distinctive and unique in price, time, severity, and construction. 
All formations can guide influences on market action. The time period covered by each formation, however, is the major deciding factor in the full manifestation of the Rule of Alternation. A sharp counter-trend correction in wave 2 covers a short distance in horizontal units. This should produce a sideways counter-trend correction in wave 4, covering a longer distance in horizontal units, and vice versa. Alternation provides analysts a notice of what not to expect when analyzing wave formations.

Corrective wave patterns unfold in forms known as zigzags, flats, or triangles. In turn these corrective patterns can come together to form more complex corrections. Similarly, a triangular corrective pattern is formed usually in wave 4, but very rarely in wave 2, and is the indication of the end of a correction.

Fibonacci relationships
R. N. Elliott's analysis of the mathematical properties of waves and patterns eventually led him to conclude that "The Fibonacci Summation Series is the basis of The Wave Principle". Numbers from the Fibonacci sequence surface repeatedly in Elliott wave structures, including motive waves (1, 3, 5), a single full cycle (8 waves), and the completed motive (89 waves) and corrective (55 waves) patterns. Elliott developed his market model before he realized that it reflects the Fibonacci sequence. "When I discovered The Wave Principle action of market trends, I had never heard of either the Fibonacci Series or the Pythagorean Diagram".

The Fibonacci sequence is also closely connected to the Golden ratio (1.618). Practitioners commonly use this ratio and related ratios to establish support and resistance levels for market waves, namely the price points which help define the parameters of a trend.  See Fibonacci retracement.

Finance professor Roy Batchelor and researcher Richard Ramyar, a former Director of the United Kingdom Society of Technical Analysts and formerly Global Head of Research at Lipper and Thomson Reuters Wealth Management, studied whether Fibonacci ratios appear non-randomly in the stock market, as Elliott's model predicts. The researchers said the "idea that prices retrace to a Fibonacci ratio or round fraction of the previous trend clearly lacks any scientific rationale". They also said "there is no significant difference between the frequencies with which price and time ratios occur in cycles in the Dow Jones Industrial Average, and frequencies which we would expect to occur at random in such a time series".

Robert Prechter replied to the Batchelor–Ramyar study, saying that it "does not challenge the validity of any aspect of the Wave Principle...it supports wave theorists' observations", and that because the authors had examined ratios between prices achieved in filtered trends rather than Elliott waves, "their method does not address actual claims by wave theorists". Prechter also claimed through the Socionomics Institute, of which he is the executive director, that data in the Batchelor–Ramyar study show "Fibonacci ratios do occur more often in the stock market than would be expected in a random environment".

Extracted from the same relationship between Elliott Waves and Fibonacci ratio, a 78.6% retracement level is identified as the best place for buying or selling (in continuation to the larger trend) as it increases the risk to reward ratio up to 1:3.

It has been suggested that Fibonacci relationships are not the only irrational number based relationships evident in waves.

After Elliott
Following Elliott's death in 1948, other market technicians and financial professionals continued to use the Wave Principle and provide forecasts to investors. Charles Collins, who had published Elliott's "Wave Principle" and helped introduce Elliott's theory to Wall Street, ranked Elliott's contributions to technical analysis on a level with Charles Dow. 

Hamilton Bolton, founder of The Bank Credit Analyst, also known as BCA Research Inc., provided wave analysis to a wide readership in the 1950s and 1960s through a number of annual supplements of market commentary. He also authored the book "The Elliott Wave Principle of Stock Market Behavior".

Bolton introduced the Elliott Wave Principle to A.J. Frost (1908-1999), who provided weekly financial commentary on the Financial News Network in the 1980s. Over the course of his lifetime Frost's contributions to the field were of great significance and today the Canadian Society of Technical Analysts awards the A.J. Frost Memorial Award to someone each year who has also made a significant contribution to the field of technical analysis. 

The first A.J. Frost Memorial Award was awarded to Robert Prechter in 1999, with whom Frost co-authored the Elliott Wave Principle in 1978.

Adoption and use
Robert Prechter found Elliott's work while working as a market technician at Merrill Lynch. His prominence as a forecaster during the bull market of the 1980s brought wide exposure to Elliott's work. Prechter remains the most widely known Elliott analyst.

Among market technicians, wave analysis is widely accepted as a component of trade. The Elliott Wave Principle is among the methods included in the exam that analysts must pass to earn the Chartered Market Technician (CMT) designation, a professional accreditation developed by the CMT Association.

Robin Wilkin, Ex-Global Head of FX and Commodity Technical Strategy at JPMorgan Chase, says "the Elliott Wave Principle ... provides a probability framework as to when to enter a particular market and where to get out, whether for a profit or a loss."

Jordan Kotick, Global Head of Technical Strategy at Barclays Capital and past President of the Market Technicians Association, has said that R. N. Elliott's "discovery was well ahead of its time. In fact, over the last decade or two, many prominent academics have embraced Elliott's idea and have been aggressively advocating the existence of financial market fractals." One such academic is the physicist Didier Sornette, professor at ETH Zurich. In a paper he co-authored in 1996 ("Stock Market Crashes, Precursors and Replicas") Sornette stated,

Glenn Neely, financial market analyst and author of the book Mastering Elliott Wave, studied the Elliott Wave Principle for years and used it to develop a forecasting method by expanding on the concepts Elliott created in the 1930s.

Researchers at the Technical University of Crete found that using a neuro-fuzzy system based on the Elliott wave principle delivered returns between 9.14% and 39.05% higher than a buy-and-hold strategy when using a hypothetical 10,000 € portfolio.

Criticism
Benoit Mandelbrot, who developed mathematical models of market pricing based on fractal geometry, expressed caution about the validity of wave models: 

Robert Prechter had previously stated that ideas in an article by Mandelbrot "originated with Ralph Nelson Elliott, who put them forth more comprehensively and more accurately with respect to real-world markets in his 1938 book The Wave Principle."

Critics warn the Wave Principle is too vague to be useful since practitioners cannot consistently identify the beginning or end of waves, resulting in forecasts prone to subjective revisions. Technical analyst David Aronson wrote: 

Some analysts consider the Elliott Wave Principle as too dated to be applicable in today's markets, as explained by market analyst Glenn Neely:

See also
 Behavioral economics
 Business cycle
 Demarcation problem
 The Wisdom of Crowds
 Kondratiev wave
 Weierstrass function

References

Further reading 
 Elliott Wave Principle: Key to Market Behavior by A.J. Frost & Robert R. Prechter, Jr. Published by New Classics Library. 
 Mastering Elliott Wave: Presenting the Neely Method: The First Scientific, Objective Approach to Market Forecasting with Elliott Wave Theory by Glenn Neely with Eric Hall. Published by Windsor Books. 
 Applying Elliott Wave Theory Profitably by Steven W. Poser. Published by John Wiley & Sons, Ltd. 
 R.N. Elliott's Masterworks by R.N. Elliott, edited by Robert R. Prechter, Jr. Published by New Classics Library. 
 Elliott Wave Principle Applied to the Foreign Exchange Markets by Robert Balan. Published by BBS Publications, Ltd.
 Elliott Wave Explained by Robert C. Beckman. Published by Orient Paperbacks.  
 Harmonic Elliott Wave:  The Case for Modification of R.N. Elliott's Impulsive Wave Structure by Ian Copsey, Published by John Wiley & Sons. 

Technical analysis
Crowd psychology